Nate Woody is an American football coach.  He is the current defensive coordinator for the Army Black Knights. Prior to Army, Woody worked for Jim Harbaugh at the University of Michigan as the senior defensive analyst. He was the former defensive coordinator of the Georgia Tech Yellow Jackets.  He previously held the same position at Wofford from 2000 to 2012, and at Appalachian State from 2013 to 2017. In 2015, he was nominated for the Broyles Award. He is a graduate of T. L. Hanna High School.

Coaching career

Appalachian State
On January 14, 2013, Woody was named the defensive coordinator of Appalachian State. The Mountaineers went 4-8 in 2013 during their first year in transition to FBS. Under his coaching, defensive lineman Ronald Blair Jr. was named All-SoCon first-team and defensive back Joel Ross Jr. was named second-team.

During the 2014 season, the Mountaineers moved to the Sun Belt Conference and went 7-5 and were not eligible for a bowl game due to changing divisions. Under his coaching, defensive back Doug Middleton was named All-Sun Belt first-team and defensive lineman Ronald Blair Jr was named second-team.

In 2015, Appalachian State was eligible for bowl games in FBS. They went 11-2 and were invited to their first bowl game. They would go on to win the 2015 Camellia Bowl 31-29 against Ohio. Under his coaching, defensive lineman Ronald Blair, linebacker John Law, and defensive back Doug Middleton was named All-Sun Belt first-team. In the 2016 NFL Draft, defensive lineman Ronald Blair was taken in the 5th round with the 142nd pick by the San Francisco 49ers.

During the 2016 season, the Mountaineers went 10-3 and was co-champions of the Sun Belt Conference, sharing with Arkansas State. They would go on to win the 2016 Camellia Bowl 31-28 against Toledo. Under his coaching, defensive backs Clifton Duck and Mondo Williams were named All-Sun Belt first-team and defensive lineman Dezmin Reed and Tee Sims along with linebackers Eric Boggs and Kennan Gilchrist were named second-team. Defensive lineman Myquon Stout and defensive back A.J. Howard were honorable mentions.

At the end of Woody's final year with the Mountaineers, the team went 9-4 and were co-champs of the Sun Belt conference. They would defeat Toledo in the 2017 Dollar General Bowl 34-0. Under his coaching, defensive lineman Tee Sims, linebacker Eric Boggs, and defensive back Clifton Duck were named All-Sun Belt first-team. Defensive back Tae Hayes was named second-team and defensive lineman Caleb Fuller, linebacker Devan Springer, and defensive back A.J. Howard were named third-team. Linebacker Anthony Flory and defensive lineman Myquon Stout were honorable mentions.

Georgia Tech
On January 6, 2018, Woody was named the defensive coordinator of Georgia Tech. The Yellow Jackets went 7-6 and qualified for a bowl game. They would go on to lose the 2018 Quick Lane Bowl 10-34 to Minnesota.

References

External links
 Appalachian State profile
 Georgia Tech profile

1960 births
Living people
American football defensive backs
American football linebackers
Appalachian State Mountaineers football coaches
Georgia Tech Yellow Jackets football coaches
Michigan Wolverines football coaches
Wofford Terriers football coaches
Wofford Terriers football players
People from Burlington, North Carolina